Harry Clay Egbert (January 3, 1839 – March 26, 1899) was an officer in the United States Army who served in the American Civil War, the Spanish–American War, and the Philippine–American War. He commanded the 6th Infantry Regiment during the Battle of San Juan Hill but suffered a mortal wound during the Battle of Manila.

Biography
Born in Philadelphia, Egbert joined the Union Army during the American Civil War, being commissioned a first lieutenant in the 12th U.S. Infantry Regiment on September 23, 1861. With the Army of the Potomac, Egbert participated in the battles of Gaines Mills and Malvern Hills. He was taken prisoner twice, during the battles of Cedar Mountain and Gettysburg, being exchanged once and escaping during Robert E. Lee's retreat from Gettysburg. He was wounded in the Battle of Bethesda Church. He was promoted to captain on April 1, 1865.

After the Civil War, he remained in the army. It would be 25 years before his next promotion, to major on April 23, 1890.

Egbert was a lieutenant colonel at the start of the Spanish–American War. He commanded the 6th Infantry Regiment in the Santiago campaign until he was wounded in the Battle of El Caney on July 1, 1898. While still recovering, he was promoted to colonel of the 22nd U.S. Infantry Regiment. On October 1, 1898, he was made a Brigadier General of U.S. Volunteers. That same year he became a Veteran Companion of the Military Order of Foreign Wars.

He was then sent to the Philippines for the Philippine–American War, arriving in Manila on March 4, 1899. During the Battle of Malinta, he was mortally wounded while leading a charge against Filipino forces in Malinta, Polo, Bulacan (present day city of Valenzuela, now part of Metro Manila) on March 26, and died the same day.

Harry Egbert is buried in Arlington National Cemetery with his wife, Ellen Young Egbert (1843–1913).

Fort Egbert (1899–1911) in Eagle, Alaska was named for him, as is Egbert Avenue in San Francisco, California.

References

External links

 

1839 births
1899 deaths
American military personnel of the Spanish–American War
American military personnel killed in the Philippine–American War
Burials at Arlington National Cemetery
Military personnel from Philadelphia
People of Pennsylvania in the American Civil War
Union Army officers
United States Army generals